In computing, a theme is a preset package containing graphical appearance and functionality details. A theme usually comprises a set of shapes and colors for the graphical control elements, the window decoration and the window. Themes are used to customize the look and feel of a piece of computer software or of an operating system.

Usage
Themes are often used to change the look and feel of a wide range of things at once, which makes them much less granular than allowing the user to set each option individually. For example, users might want the window-borders from a particular theme, but installing it would also alter the desktop background.

One method for dealing with this is to allow the user to select which parts of the theme they want to load; for example in Windows 98, users could load the background and screensaver from a theme, but leave the icons and sounds untouched.

Themed systems

Operating systems

Microsoft Windows first supported themes in Windows 95 as a separate application package called Microsoft Plus! for Windows 95. Themes were later supported in Windows 98 and was built-in there. These operating systems, as well as its successor, Windows Me, came with themes that customized desktop backgrounds, icons, user interface colors, Windows sounds and mouse cursors. Windows XP expanded Windows theming support by adding visual styles and allowing each theme to specify one. This feature was carried over to Windows Vista which added Windows Aero, but was removed with Windows 8. Third-party apps such as WindowBlinds, TuneUp Utilities and Desktop Architect enhance theme capabilities. Support for custom themes can also be added by patching system files, which is not endorsed by Microsoft.

Linux operating systems may support themes depending on their window managers and desktop environments. IceWM uses themes to customize its taskbar, window borders, and time format. WindowMaker can store colors for icons, menus, and window-borders in a theme, but this is independent of the wallpaper settings. GNOME and KDE use two independent sets of themes: one to alter the appearance of user interface elements (such as buttons, scroll bars or list elements), and another theme to customize the appearance of windows (such as, window borders and title bars).

macOS does not natively support themes. Third-party apps such as Kaleidoscope and ShapeShifter may add this.

 Although Android does not support themes, the forked CyanogenMod and its successor LineageOS have native theme support. The CM theme engine is in turn used on many other forked Android ROMs, such as Paranoid Android.

Apps
Firefox and Google Chrome either support or supported a form of theme. Firefox (and its sibling Thunderbird) supports themes either through lightweight themes (formerly Personas) or complete themes. While lightweight themes are simply background images for toolbar Firefox toolbars, complete themes have more power to modify Firefox's appearance. Google Chrome version 3.0 or later allows themes to alter the appearance of the browser. Internet Explorer 5 and its immediate successor allowed the background picture of their toolbars to be customized.

See also
Skin (computing)
Computer wallpaper
Look and feel
User interface engineering
Industrial design
Aqua (user interface)

References

Graphical user interfaces
Software add-ons